Utba ibn Abi Sufyan ibn Harb was a member of the Umayyad ruling family and served as the Umayyad governor of Egypt in 664–665, during the reign of his brother, Caliph Mu'awiya I.

Life

Utba was a son of Abu Sufyan ibn Harb of the Banu Umayya and Hind bint Utba ibn Rabi'a ibn Abd Shams. Under Caliph Umar ibn al-Khattab, he was charged with collecting the sadaqat (tribute) from the Kinanah tribe based around Mecca. He sought to use the money collected from them towards trade. He fought alongside most of the Quraysh led by the Islamic prophet Muhammad's wife A'isha against Muhammad's cousin, Caliph Ali, in the Battle of the Camel near Basra in 656. In the immediate aftermath of Ali's victory, Utba took refuge with A'isha and avoided giving allegiance to Ali. He soon after managed to escape to Damascus, where his brother, Mu'awiya ruled as governor of Syria. In the alliance negotiations between Mu'awiya and Amr ibn al-As, Utba pressed his brother to accept Amr's offer of receiving the lifetime governorship of Egypt in return for his support against Ali. Utba was later part of Mu'awiya's retinue during the Battle of Siffin against Ali in 657. Mu'awiya became caliph in 661 and appointed Utba to lead the annual Hajj pilgrimage to Mecca in March 662. 

Following the death of Amr in 664, his son Abdullah was appointed governor of Egypt for a few weeks in 664 before he was removed from his position and Utba was appointed governor of Egypt. He strengthened the Muslim Arab presence and elevated the political status of Alexandria by attaching 12,000 Arab troops to the city and constructing a Dar al-Imara (governor's palace). The Dar al-Imara was intended to serve as the residence of the Arab governor of the province, who was based in Fustat. Utba was the first Arab governor of Egypt recorded to have visited Alexandria by the Arabic sources, though Amr is implicitly said to have entered the city as governor, according to al-Baladhuri. Nonetheless, Utba remained concerned that troop numbers in Alexandria remained insufficient and vulnerable to the large, local Christian population there. Utba died in office in 665, and was succeeded by the muleteer of Muhammad, Uqba ibn Amir. According to the 9th-century historian al-Tabari, however, Utba led the Hajj in February 667, and he or his brother Anbasa led it again the following year, in January 668.

Utba's son al-Walid went on to serve as governor of Medina under Mu'awiya and his son and successor, Caliph Yazid I. A descendant of Utba, Abd Allah ibn Muhammad al-Utbi was recorded as a source of information in the history of al-Tabari.

References

Bibliography

660s deaths
7th-century Arabs
7th-century Umayyad governors of Egypt
Year of birth unknown
Umayyad dynasty